The 2nd Annual Indonesian Movie Awards was held on March 28, 2008, at the Plenary Hall, Jakarta Convention Center, Central Jakarta. The award show was hosted by Nirina Zubir, Choky Sitohang, Wulan Guritno, and Ringgo Agus Rahman. And the nominations have been announced for the category of Favorite, which will be chosen by the public via SMS. As for the category of Best, will be selected by a jury that has been appointed. For the category which contested are the same as last year's celebration.

The national film participated in the 2008 of celebration is a movie that was released in the period March 1, 2007 to January 30, 2008. The time span that registration on December 11, 2007 to January 30, 2008. And the number of nominations received, of which 16 drama genre titles, 13 horror film titles, one children film title (Anak-Anak Borobudur) and the other of comedy film.

Radit dan Jani is a film with receiving of the most awards this year, with three awards. Other film Nagabonar Jadi 2, Quickie Express, and Mereka Bilang, Saya Monyet! compete behind with two awards each, while another film receiving one award each.

Nominees and winners

Best
Winners are listed first and highlighted in boldface.

Favorite
Winners are listed first and highlighted in boldface.

Film with most nominations and awards

Most nominations

The following film received most nominations:

Most wins
The following film received most nominations:

References

External links
  Ulasan

Indonesian
2008 in Indonesia
Indonesian Movie Actor Awards